The Babcock–Smith House is a historic house in Westerly, Rhode Island.

The house was built around 1734. Dr. Joshua Babcock, a correspondent with Benjamin Franklin, lived in the house and hosted both Franklin and General George Washington at the home. Babcock served also as a general in the state militia, as a justice of the Rhode Island Supreme Court, and as Westerly's first postmaster in the 1770s. He operated the post office and a general store out of this house. Babcock died in 1783 and "his family occupied the house until 1817. When his second wife, Anna Maxson Babcock, died in 1812, the property was passed to Dudley Babcock. Dudley, having lost some ships in the war of 1812 and unable to pay some debts, sold the house to his distant cousin, Oliver Wells, in 1817. Mr. Wells used it as a prosperous tenant farm, however the house was allowed to fall into disrepair."

Orlando Smith bought the property in 1846; he repaired the house and started a successful granite business based on a granite outcrop he had discovered there.

The house was added to the National Register of Historic Places and became a museum in 1972.

See also
National Register of Historic Places listings in Washington County, Rhode Island

References

External links

Houses in Washington County, Rhode Island
Westerly, Rhode Island
Former post office buildings
Houses completed in 1750
Houses on the National Register of Historic Places in Rhode Island
National Register of Historic Places in Washington County, Rhode Island
Historic American Buildings Survey in Rhode Island
Colonial architecture in Rhode Island